William Clay Ford Sr. (March 14, 1925 – March 9, 2014) was an American businessman who served on the boards of Ford Motor Company and the Edison Institute. Ford owned the Detroit Lions of the National Football League (NFL). He was the youngest child of Edsel Ford and was the last surviving grandchild of Henry Ford.

Early life and education

Ford was born on March 14, 1925, in Detroit to Edsel Ford and Eleanor Lowthian Clay.

He graduated from the Hotchkiss School in Lakeville, Connecticut, in 1943 and received a Bachelor of Science in Economics from Yale University in 1949; he was a member of the Psi Upsilon fraternity, captain of the soccer and tennis teams, an honorable mention all American selection in soccer senior year, and winner of seven varsity letters as a collegiate athlete. Ford also served in the U.S. Navy Air Corps during World War II.

Personal life
Following the war, Ford married Martha Parke Firestone, the granddaughter of Harvey Firestone and Idabelle Smith Firestone, on June 21, 1947, at St. Paul's Episcopal Church in Akron, Ohio. William first met Martha at a lunch in New York City arranged and attended by both of their mothers, according to the biography The Fords. Martha then was a Vassar student who had the college nickname "Stoney." He was a naval cadet at St. Mary's U.S. Navy Pre-Flight School. By that time both families had acquired considerable wealth, and the matchup between the grandchildren of two empire-builders was reported by numerous news outlets. The Akron Beacon Journal called the Firestone-Ford nuptials "the biggest society wedding in Akron's history" and "the biggest show Akron has seen in years" in numerous articles chronicling the event. The couple received gifts from F.B.I. Director J. Edgar Hoover, media publisher John S. Knight, and Mina Miller Edison.

The couple had four children: Martha Parke Morse (b. 1948), Sheila Firestone Ford Hamp (b. 1951), William Clay Ford Jr. (b. 1957), and Elizabeth Hudson Ford Kontulis (b. 1961). As of 2018, his son William was the Executive Chairman of the Board of Directors of Ford Motor Company. He had previously been the Chief Executive Officer and Chief Operating Officer of Ford. Their children Martha, Sheila, and William also serve as Vice Chairmen of the Detroit Lions, while Sheila was announced to take over as principal owner and chairwoman in June 2020.

Professional career
After graduating from Yale, Ford worked for the Ford Motor Company, and briefly led the Continental Division. The Continental Division, however, was short-lived and merged with the Lincoln Motor Company shortly before Ford's public stock offering. Ford redesigned the Lincoln Continental, a vehicle his father created; in 1955, the Continental Mark II was released. Only two pictures adorned his office wall, his father's Continental and his updated Mark II.

In 1948, a year after Henry Ford's death, Ford was appointed to Ford Motor Company's board of directors. Ford was chairman of the board at the Henry Ford Museum, from 1951 to 1983. He was also involved in other historic properties, serving on the boards of the Wayside Inn and Seaboard Properties, which managed the Dearborn Inn and Botsford Inn.

The Lions' board of directors approved the transaction on November 22, 1963. During Ford's ownership, the Lions won 41 percent of their regular-season games, made the playoffs ten times (with a total of 1 playoff win) and never appeared in the Super Bowl. He was also chairman of the short-lived Detroit Cougars, a professional soccer team, which played in the USA and NASL leagues.

He was Ford Motor Company's Design Committee chairman for 32 years, from 1957 to 1989. He served on the board of directors for 57 years, retiring on May 12, 2005, including being chairman of the Finance Committee. His son, William Clay Ford Jr., was Ford Motor Company's CEO at the time.

According to Forbes magazine, Ford was the 371st richest person in the United States in 2013, with an approximate net worth of $1.4 billion. He reportedly owned in Ford Motor Company: 6.7 million shares of Class B stock and 26.3 million common shares; making him the largest single shareholder. In 2000 the company restructured and paid out a $10 billion special dividend. According to an article from 2000, incidental to a repurchase of outstanding shares: "The Ford family holds all 71 million shares of the company's Class B stock, along with a small number of the company's 1.1 billion common shares. Under rules designed to preserve family control and drafted when the company went public in 1956, the family holds 40 percent of the voting power at the company as long as it continues to own at least 60.7 million shares of the Class B stock – even though the Class B shares make up only 6 percent of the company's overall equity... Why does this exist? The Ford family owns all 70+ million shares of the Class B stock. It is a way for them to ensure they keep control of the company no matter how much stock they have to issue to avoid bankruptcy. Some argue that dual class structures are inherently unfair because you are decoupling ownership from voting power."

Death
Ford died of pneumonia, five days before his 89th birthday, at his home in Grosse Pointe Shores, Michigan, on March 9, 2014. He is buried in Woodlawn Cemetery in Detroit, near his parents and elder brother, Benson.

See also
 Ford family tree

References

Notes

Citations

Sources

External links
 Detroit Lions bio
 Forbes 400 profile

1925 births
2014 deaths
Detroit Lions owners
Ford executives
North American Soccer League (1968–1984) executives
People in the automobile industry
United States Navy personnel of World War II
Military personnel from Michigan
United States Naval Aviators
Hotchkiss School alumni
Yale College alumni
Businesspeople from Detroit
Sportspeople from Detroit
Firestone family
Henry Ford family
Deaths from pneumonia in Michigan
Burials at Woodlawn Cemetery (Detroit)
Psi Upsilon